James Vernon Tyrone (born January 29, 1949) is an American former professional baseball outfielder. He played all or part of four seasons in Major League Baseball (MLB) from 1972 to 1977, for the Chicago Cubs and Oakland Athletics. He also played four seasons in Nippon Professional Baseball (NPB) from 1979 to 1982, for the Seibu Lions and Nankai Hawks.

Jim's brother, Wayne Tyrone, also played in the major leagues for the Cubs in 1976. Despite being in the same organization for four-plus seasons, the two were never teammates at any level, until playing together for the 1979 Miami Amigos..

In 1983, Jim appeared on the American television game show The Price is Right and briefly talked about his time in baseball.

Personal life 

Jim was the oldest of five kids (Wayne Tyrone, JoEtta Duncan, Lenoard Tyrone) of the late Ora Lee and Oscar Lee Tyrone, who married in 1948 and divorced in 1974. Oscar remarried to Norma Jean in 1975 in which Jon Tyrone was born in that union. Tyrone married Lamar Casas in 1982 (divorced 1992) and resided in Pasadena, California upon his return to Texas in 1993. He has five children: Dal Davenport (from a previous relationship), Marquita Tyrone, Maegan Tyrone, Sommer Tyrone, and Allison Tyrone along with seven grandchildren (3 girls and 4 boys). He currently lives in Arlington, Texas where he privately instructed kids with their batting before his retirement.

External links 
, or Retrosheet
 Pura Pelota (Venezuelan Winter League)

1949 births
Living people
American expatriate baseball players in Canada
American expatriate baseball players in Japan
Baseball players from Texas
Chicago Cubs players
Major League Baseball outfielders
Miami Amigos players
Midland Cubs players
Nankai Hawks players
Navegantes del Magallanes players
American expatriate baseball players in Venezuela
Oakland Athletics players
People from Alice, Texas
Quincy Cubs players
San Jose Missions players
Seibu Lions players
UT Rio Grande Valley Vaqueros baseball players
Vancouver Canadians players
Wichita Aeros players